Occidental Life Insurance Company Building is a historic office building located at Raleigh, North Carolina. The building is located in Cameron Village, North Carolina's first suburban shopping center.  It was built in 1956, and is a four-story, 68,000 square-foot steel frame structure encapsulated in concrete. The building was design by architecture firm Kemp, Bunch & Jackson and in the International Style. It has a brick base, limestone walls, aluminum windows with green-tinted glass, and entrance canopies with rounded aluminum eaves.  Prior to moving to this building, the Occidental Life Insurance Company offices were housed in the Professional Building for nearly 30 years.

It was listed on the National Register of Historic Places in 2003.

References 

Office buildings on the National Register of Historic Places in North Carolina
International style architecture in North Carolina
Office buildings completed in 1956
Buildings and structures in Raleigh, North Carolina
National Register of Historic Places in Raleigh, North Carolina